The men's sprint event at the 2022 World Singles Ninepin Bowling Classic Championships was held in Elva, Estonia on 25 May 2022.

Gold medal was won by Austrian Matthias Zatschkowitsch, who defeated Hungarian Zsombor Zapletan in the final. Bronze medals went to semi-finalists Frenchman Frédéric Koell and Romanian Bogdan Horatiu Dudas.

Results

Starting places 
The starting places have been allocated on the basis of each nation achievements during the previous championships.

Draw 
The players were drawn into bouts with the reservation that competitors from the same country can not play in the first round against each other.

References 

2022
Men's sprint